Noah Wallace (born July 6, 1991) is an American freestyle skier. He won a bronze medal in Slopestyle at the FIS Freestyle Ski and Snowboarding World Championships 2015.

References

External links
 
 

American male freestyle skiers
1991 births
Living people